Sergei Viktorovich Ushakov (born 27 April 1965) is a Russian professional football coach and a former player.

Club career
He made his professional debut in the Soviet Second League in 1982 for FC Dynamo Stavropol.

References

1965 births
People from Kopeysk
Living people
Soviet footballers
Expatriate footballers in Kazakhstan
Russian footballers
Association football defenders
Russian Premier League players
Russian football managers
FC Dynamo Stavropol players
FC Dynamo Moscow players
FC Kairat players
Russian expatriate sportspeople in Kazakhstan
Sportspeople from Chelyabinsk Oblast